Sci Phi Journal is a quarterly online magazine (formerly monthly, with a print option) devoted to publishing science fiction stories and essays "at the intersection between speculative philosophy", anthropology and other humanities, with a particular focus on "fictional non-fiction". The first issue was published in October 2014. Jason Rennie founded and helmed the publication with Ben Zwycky until mid-2017. The quarterly was then briefly managed by Ray Blank, and has been edited by Adam Gerencser and Mariano Martin Rodriguez since January 2019, the pair having relaunched the magazine as a "European project".

In November 2014, a short story by Lou Antonelli featured in the magazine's second issue was nominated for the 2015 Hugo Award for Best Short Story. In 2016, the journal was a finalist for the Hugo Award, and nominated for the Locus Award. At the 2022 EuroCon held in Luxembourg, Sci Phi Journal won the European SF Award for Best Magazine. Cover art and non-fiction essays featured in the magazine were also finalists for the 2022 Utopia Awards.

Notable authors
Notable authors published in the magazine include:

 Lou Antonelli
 Michael F. Flynn
 Andrew Fraknoi
 Sean Patrick Hazlett
 L. Jagi Lamplighter
 Edward M. Lerner
 Paul Levinson
 Brian Niemeier
 Benjamin Rosenbaum
 Luís Filipe Silva
 Shweta Taneja
 Ian Watson

References

External links
 Official site

Science fiction magazines
Science fiction magazines established in the 2010s
Online magazines
Science fiction webzines